The following lists events that happened during 1964 in Cape Verde.

Incumbents
Colonial governor:
Leão Maria Tavares Rosado do Sacramento Monteiro

Events

Sports
Académica do Mindelo won the Cape Verdean Football Championship

Births
Teófilo Chantre, singer
September 2: Daniel Batista Lima, footballer
October 21: Mário Lúcio, singer, former Minister of culture
November 6: José Rui, footballer
December 13: Ildo Augusto dos Santos Lopes Fortes, bishop of Mindelo

References

 
1964 in the Portuguese Empire
Years of the 20th century in Cape Verde
1960s in Cape Verde
Cape Verde
Cape Verde